The South Slave Region is one of five administrative regions in the Northwest Territories of Canada. According to Municipal and Community Affairs the region consists of seven communities with the regional office situated in Fort Smith and a sub-office in Hay River. With the exception of Enterprise and Hay River the communities are predominantly First Nations.

Communities
The South Slave Region includes the following communities:

References

External links

South Slave Region at Municipal and Community Affairs